KEYC-TV (channel 12) is a television station licensed to Mankato, Minnesota, United States, affiliated with CBS and Fox. It is owned by Gray Television alongside low-power, dual NBC/CW+ affiliate KMNF-LD (channel 7). Both stations share studios on Lookout Drive in North Mankato, while KEYC-TV's transmitter is located near Lewisville, Minnesota.

The Mankato market is within reach of some television stations based in the Twin Cities. CBS owned-and-operated station WCCO-TV has an over-the-air signal that reaches Mankato proper, and the station is offered locally on Charter Spectrum channel 4. Due to the cable presence of WCCO, KEYC can invoke the Federal Communications Commission (FCC)'s network non-duplication rule resulting in Spectrum blacking out programming from the former during network shows. WCCO's newscasts and some of its syndicated programs can be seen, however.

History
KEYC-TV signed on October 5, 1960, just in time to broadcast the first game of the World Series that night from NBC. It was owned by Lee Enterprises which also started nearby KGLO-TV (now KIMT) in Mason City, Iowa. Less than a year later, KEYC switched its affiliation to CBS which has been maintained to this day. Lee Enterprises, intending to purchase KOIN-TV in Portland, Oregon, was forced to sell KEYC to United Communications in 1977 due to ownership limits imposed by the FCC. During UPN's existence, the station carried some of that network's programming through a secondary arrangement.

KEYC was a major beneficiary of an exception to the FCC's "2½ + 1" plan for allocating VHF television bandwidth. In the early days of broadcast television, there were twelve VHF channels available, and 69 UHF channels (which was later reduced to 56 with the removal of high-band channels 70–83 in the early 1980s). The VHF bands were more desirable because signals broadcasting on that band traveled a longer distance. Because there were only twelve VHF channels available, there were limitations as to how closely the stations could be spaced. With the release of the FCC's Sixth Report and Order in 1952, the Commission outlined a new allocation table for VHF licenses and opened up the UHF band. Through these initiatives, almost all of the United States would be able to receive two commercial VHF channels plus one non-commercial allocation. Most of the rest of the country ("1/2") would be able to receive a third VHF channel. Other areas of the country would be designated as "UHF islands," since they were too close to larger cities for VHF service.

However, what would become of the Mankato market was sandwiched between Minneapolis–Saint Paul (channels 2, 4, 5, 9, and 11) to the north, Rochester (channels 3, 6, and 10) to the east, Sioux Falls (channels 2, 5, 11, and 13) to the west, and Des Moines (channels 5, 8, 11, and 13) to the southeast. This created a large "doughnut" in Mankato where there could only be one VHF license. KEYC was fortunate enough to gain that license. To this day, KEYC is the only full-power TV station based in Mankato, in the 13th smallest TV market (Nielsen DMA #198).

On July 1, 2007, the station signed on a new second digital subchannel and brought Fox programming to the market for the first time; this subchannel replaced Minneapolis stations WFTC (channel 29) and later KMSP-TV (channel 9), which have both been carried on cable systems in southwestern Minnesota since before the Fox network began operations in 1986. KEYC's broadcasts became digital-only effective June 12, 2009. It is the sole commercial station in the area that it serves which is ranked as the 13th smallest (ranked #198) out of 210 in the United States. However, KEYC is not without significant competition because outlets from the Twin Cities, the 15th largest market, cover major news and weather events in the region, and their signals are extended into the region via an extensive translator network.

On February 8, 2019, Gray Television announced it was purchasing the United stations, including KEYC. In advance of the purchase, Gray assumed control of the station via a local marketing agreement (LMA) on March 1. KEYC would be Gray's first station in Minnesota. The sale was completed on May 1.

KEYC-DT2
KEYC-DT2, branded on air as KEYC Fox, is the Fox-affiliated second digital subchannel of KEYC-TV, broadcasting in 720p high definition on channel 12.2. Although the main over-the-air signal of KMSP-TV barely reaches Mankato proper, it is simulcast over K35KI-D in nearby St. James through the local municipal-operated Cooperative TV (CTV) network of translators; KMSP-TV is also offered locally in Mankato on channel 9 on both Charter Spectrum and Consolidated Communications.

In November 2017, KEYC-DT2 was upgraded to 720p HD; it had previously been in 480i widescreen standard definition.

Programming
KEYC-TV airs the entire CBS schedule; it began clearing the CBS News program known as the CBS Overnight News when it started 24-hour-a-day broadcasting on September 14, 2020. Syndicated programming on KEYC-DT1 includes Wheel of Fortune, Live with Kelly and Ryan, Dr. Phil, and Inside Edition among others. Syndicated programming on KEYC-DT2 includes Jeopardy! and The People's Court among others.

KEYC-TV maintains a highly local focus such as through its production of the long-running music series Bandwagon. Another program that have aired almost throughout the station's history was a local religious program, I Believe in Miracles, which first aired on February 19, 1961. Miracles aired for the last time on KEYC on February 8, 2015. Various other local programs have aired over the years as well as a variety of specials such as on holiday music or major community issues.

Newscasts
On January 15, 2018, KEYC debuted a new weekday morning newscast. KEYC News Now This Morning airs for one hour starting at 6 a.m. On February 25, 2019, it was expanded to 1½ hours starting at 5:30 a.m. There are local news and weather cut-ins during CBS Mornings from 7 until 9. KEYC News Now offers local newscasts weekdays at noon for a half-hour, Monday through Friday at 5 p.m., Monday through Saturday nights at 6, and every night at 10. KEYC News Now at 9 airs seven nights a week on KEYC-DT2. In September 2022, KEYC launched Kato Living, a weekday lifestyle program.

Technical information

Subchannels
The station's digital signal is multiplexed:

Former translator stations
The broadcast signal of KEYC was extended by way of three digital translators in southern Minnesota until December 22, 2017, when United Communications could not negotiate a new leasing agreement with tower owner BENCO/CTV.
K49JG-D 49 Frost 
K50KL-D 50 Jackson 
K38MY-D 38 St. James

The Frost and Jackson translators were located in the Minneapolis–St. Paul market, while the St. James translator was in the Mankato market.

References

External links

Rabbitears.info query - KEYC

CBS network affiliates
Fox network affiliates
Circle (TV network) affiliates
Television channels and stations established in 1960
1960 establishments in Minnesota
EYC-TV
Gray Television